Wandong railway station is located on the North East line in Victoria, Australia. It serves the town of Wandong, and opened on 11 April 1876.

History
The station opened as a siding named Morphett's, with the North East line to Wodonga having opened in 1872. Soon after that, a short platform was provided alongside the road level crossing, and named Wandong. In 1896, the crossing gatehouse was converted into a station building and signal box and, in 1899, a timber bridge replaced the level crossing. Sidings for timber loading were also provided, and a narrow gauge tramway brought saw timber from nearby sawmills.

A permanent station building was provided in 1900, along with interlocking for the signals and a lever frame. In 1937, a crossover at the down end of the station was abolished.

The present road bridge, located at the down end of the station, dates to 1961, and in the same year, siding "B" was abolished. The following year, in 1962, the Melbourne-Albury standard gauge line opened, operating behind Platform 1.

In 1978, all signals at the station were removed. The station building on the down platform (Platform 2) was removed in 1979, and the current shelters on the platforms were provided in 1990. A weatherboard shelter on the down platform had been removed by August 1991.

Wandong station was damaged in the 2009 Black Saturday bushfires, with repairs required to two bridges, 1,200 railway sleepers, and part of the platform. In August of that year, a new footbridge opened in the up direction from the station. Painted bright blue, the bridge complies with the requirements of the Disability Discrimination Act, but has been criticised as dominating the surrounding landscape.

Platforms and services
Wandong has two side platforms. It is served by V/Line Seymour and Shepparton line trains.

Platform 1:
 services to Southern Cross
 services to Southern Cross

Platform 2:
 services to Seymour
 services to Shepparton

References

External links
Victorian Railway Stations gallery

Railway stations in Australia opened in 1876
Regional railway stations in Victoria (Australia)
Shire of Mitchell